The 2005–06 Pervaya Liga season was the 14th season of the Pervaya Liga, the third level of ice hockey in Russia.

Ural-Western Siberia Zone

Regular season

Final round

External links 
 Season on hockeyarchives.info

3